Marmozets are an English rock band from Bingley, West Yorkshire, England. Formed in 2007, the band consists of Rebecca "Becca" Macintyre (vocals), Jack Bottomley (guitar), Sam Macintyre (guitar/vocals), Will Bottomley (bass/vocals) and Josh Macintyre (drums). Marmozets signed to Roadrunner Records in October 2013 and released their debut album on 29 September 2014. Their second album, Knowing What You Know Now, was released on 26 January 2018.

Biography

Early years, The Weird and Wonderful Marmozets (2007–2016)
The two sets of siblings formed the band while at school and have been playing live since 2007, gathering widespread acclaim for their chaotic live shows despite an average age of just 15. The band were originally called The Marmozets, and under this name they released one EP titled "Out of My Control" in 2009. They soon after altered their name to just Marmozets.

They have shared stages with the likes of Young Guns, Funeral For a Friend, Gallows, Hyro Da Hero, The Used, Four Year Strong and Muse and have appeared at Glastonbury Festival, Download Festival, Reading and Leeds, Rock Werchter, Slam Dunk Festival, 2000 Trees and Y Not Festival.

They released their EP, Passive Aggressive in 2011 and followed that with Vexed in 2012. Gallows' record label Venn Records released Marmozets' first single "Good Days" in 2012. In 2013 the band self-released their second single, "Born Young and Free", before the band signed to Roadrunner Records and released "Move Shake Hide". Both singles received high praise from BBC Radio 1 DJs Zane Lowe, Daniel P Carter and Huw Stephens. The band released the single "Why Do You Hate Me?" on 17 March 2014.

The band was nominated for Best British Newcomer at the 2013 Kerrang! Awards and were voted Best New UK Band by Big Cheese magazine. Along with the singles released in the run up to the album, the band had also performed a few other unreleased tracks live that would feature on their debut album, including "Is It Horrible", "Cover Up" and "Hit the Wave". Marmozets embarked on their first headline UK tour in September 2013.

They released their debut album The Weird and Wonderful Marmozets on 29 September 2014. It received critical acclaim, later winning the 2015 Kerrang! Award for Best Album.

In March 2015, it was announced that Marmozets would be supporting Muse on their 2015 UK Psycho Tour.

Knowing What You Know Now (2017–present)
Work on the band's second album was delayed when Becca McIntyre was hospitalised after being diagnosed with hypermobility syndrome. McIntyre had to endure several operations and months of recovery before returning to the band.

In January 2017, Sam Macintyre announced via Twitter that the band had completed their second album. The first song from the album, Play, was released in August 2017 and reached the top of the Kerrang! Rock Chart. The song was also used as one of the official themes of the NXT Takeover special, NXT TakeOver: WarGames.

On 10 October, the band released a second single from the album, titled "Habits", which was played on BBC Radio 1 prior to its official digital release. The band also announced details of their new album "Knowing What You Know Now" and made it available to pre-order. On 11 December 2017, the band released the third single from their new album titled 'Major System Error'. The album was released on 26 January 2018.

In 2019, bandmates Rebecca Macintyre and Jack Bottomley welcomed their first child. In June 2022, Rebecca and Jack announced their marriage and that the band was working on new music.

Members

Current line-up 
 Rebecca "Becca" Macintyre – lead vocals
 Jack Bottomley – lead guitar
 Sam Macintyre – rhythm guitar, backing vocals
 Will Bottomley – bass, backing vocals
 Josh Macintyre – drums

Previous members 
 Joe Doherty – guitar

Discography

Studio albums

EPs

Singles

References

External links 
  Is no longer active.
 
 Marmozets at Roadrunner Records

Math rock groups
Punk rock groups from West Yorkshire
Post-hardcore groups
English alternative rock groups
Roadrunner Records artists
Female-fronted musical groups